The 1986 Australia rugby union tour of New Zealand was a series of matches played by Australia national rugby union team in New Zealand between July and September 1986. Australia won the series against New Zealand with two victories in three matches. The final game at Eden Park marked the last time the Wallabies beat the All Blacks there.

Results
Scores and results list Australia's points tally first.

Sources

Australia national rugby union team tours of New Zealand
tour
tour